Hannes Zerbe (born 17 December 1941) is a German jazz composer and pianist.

Life 
Zerbe was born in Litzmannstadt. After studying electrical engineering, he studied piano and musical composition at the Hochschule für Musik "Hanns Eisler" and the Hochschule für Musik Carl Maria von Weber. He has been a professional musician since 1969.

From 1985 to 1987, he was a master student for composition with Paul-Heinz Dittrich at the Akademie der Künste der DDR. Zerbe has organised and led international workshops and tours in the fields of jazz and improvised music since the late 1970s.

In 1979, he founded his large-scale "Hannes Zerbe Blech Band" with which compositions by Hanns Eisler were also performed. From 1980, he also played in a duo with the tuba player Dietrich Unkrodt, and from 1995 in a duo with the clarinettist . Furthermore, Zerbe was involved in text-music projects with actors, directors and singers (for example Lauren Newton), including Bert Brecht, Ingeborg Bachmann, Kurt Schwitters and Heiner Müller.

He has worked with other contemporary jazz musicians (including Willem Breuker), Charlie Mariano, Klaus Koch and Gebhard Ullmann. Since 1996, he has led the Berlin "Jazzorchester Prokopätz", which performs compositions by Eisler, Weill, Breuker and Zerbe in big band format. Experiences with this workshop line-up flowed into the "Hannes Zerbe Jazz Orchester", founded in 2011. In a duo with the saxophonist Dirk Engelhardt, he also improvises on poems by Gottfried Benn.

Among other works, Zerbe wrote a Concerto for Alto Saxophone and Orchestra and Reflections on Eisler's Winter Battle Suite. He also composed for film.

Zerbe is also involved in political contexts. With his ensemble and with the actor Rolf Becker in the cultural programme of the Rosa Luxemburg Conference of the left-wing daily newspaper junge Welt, he arranged the performance of Das Floß der Medusa – Requiem für Che Guevara by Hans Werner Henze.

Recordings 
 Blech Band (Amiga 1984)
 Rondo a la Fried (BVHaast 1992)
 Brecht: Alles wandelt sich with Gina Pietsch (vocals) and Jürgen Kupke (clarinet) (1991)
 Jazzorchester Prokopätz (2005)
 Peter Hacks: Was träumt der Teufel with Gina Pietsch (Ohreule 2009)
 Hannes Zerbe Jazz Orchester Eisleriana (2011 )
 Hannes Zerbe Jazz Orchester Erlkönig (2013 JazzHausMusik)
 Hannes Zerbe/Jazz Orchestra Berlin: Kalkutta (2017 JazzHausMusik)

Radio play music 
 1992: : König und Besenbinder – direction: Peter Groeger (Kinderhörspiel – DS Kultur)

Further reading 
  (ed.), unter Mitarbeit von : . Reclam, Stuttgart 2003, .
 Jürgen Wölfer: Jazz in Deutschland. Das Lexikon. Alle Musiker und Plattenfirmen von 1920 bis heute. Hannibal, Höfen 2008, .

References

External links 
 
  Homepage von 'Prokopätz'
 

20th-century classical composers
German jazz composers
German jazz pianists
1941 births
Living people
People from Łódź
20th-century jazz composers